The Girl He Left Behind is a 1956 American romantic comedy film starring Tab Hunter and Natalie Wood. The supporting cast includes Jim Backus, Alan King, James Garner, and David Janssen. The film was written by Guy Trosper and directed by David Butler, and was filmed at Fort Ord, California. For both Garner and King, it was their third movie.

Plot

Andy Schaeffer is a spoiled mama's boy who usually gets his way. He breezes through college, while girlfriend Susan Daniels works hard at a job to pay for her education. She isn't sure where their relationship is going. Andy's grades begin to worsen, and he's being drafted by the army. Andy reports for basic training at Fort Ord, making it clear to everybody there that he'd rather be anyplace else.

Cast
 Tab Hunter as Private / Corporal Andy Schaeffer
 Natalie Wood as Susan
 Jessie Royce Landis as Mrs. Schaeffer
 Jim Backus as Sergeant Hanna
 Murray Hamilton as Sergeant Clyde
 Henry Jones as Hanson
 Alan King as Majors
 James Garner as Preston
 David Janssen as Captain Genaro

Production
Marion Hargrove had a huge success with his book See Here Private Hargrove which sold 3,500,000 copies. Warner Bros. approached him to see if he would write a story about a draftee in the army in peacetime.

Hargrove agreed but wanted the story to be accurate, as he had left the army in 1945. He arranged through Warners to undertake enlistment and some basic training at Fort Ord. Hargrove told Warners he had enough material for the book. The studio paid him to write the novel and retained only the screen rights.

The novel was published in 1956. Hargrove wanted to call it All Quiet in the Third Platoon, but Warners preferred The Girl He Left Behind.

Tab Hunter and Natalie Wood had appeared in The Burning Hills together, and Warner Bros. was keen to build them into an on-screen team.

Filming started June 1956. Much of the film was shot at Fort Ord and used real soldiers.

See also
 List of American films of 1956

References
Notes

External links
 
 
 
 

1950s romantic comedy-drama films
1956 films
Warner Bros. films
American romantic comedy-drama films
Films scored by Roy Webb
Films directed by David Butler
Films shot in California
Military humor in film
1950s English-language films
1950s American films
American black-and-white films